William Merriman (10 November 1878 – 23 November 1963) was an Irish Gaelic footballer. His championship career with the Kildare senior team yielded one All-Ireland medal.

References

1878 births
1963 deaths
Kildare inter-county Gaelic footballers